Pauletta is a surname. Notable people with the name include:
 Hubertson Pauletta (born 1989), Dutch Antillean footballer
 Ivan Pauletta (1936–2017), Istrian Italian politician, journalist and writer active in Croatia
 Lacey Pauletta (born 1988), Dutch Antillean footballer

References 

Surnames of Italian origin
Surnames of Curaçao origin